The Bukovec Mountains is a flysch mountain range in north-eastern Slovakia, part of the Eastern Beskids of the Outer Eastern Carpathians. 

It is located in the Prešov Region near the borders with Poland (Bieszczady Mountains) and Ukraine, and adjacent to the Laborec Highlands.

Original flora and fauna was preserved because of the area's remoteness. The mountain range is covered with beech forests. The area is protected by Poloniny National Park. Localities Havešová, Stužica and Rožok are listed on the UNESCO World Heritage Site list.

External links
Images at Hiking.sk
Crossing Bukovec Mountains in summer at Horydoly.cz
Crossing Bukovec mountains and Bieszczady in winter at Horydoly.cz

Mountain ranges of Slovakia
Mountain ranges of the Eastern Carpathians